Ross William Ulbricht (born March 27, 1984) is an American serving life imprisonment for creating and operating the darknet market website Silk Road from 2011 until his arrest in 2013. The site operated as a hidden service on the Tor network and facilitated the sale of narcotics and other illegal products and services. Ulbricht ran the site under the pseudonym "Dread Pirate Roberts", after the fictional character from The Princess Bride.

In 2013, the Federal Bureau of Investigation (FBI) arrested Ulbricht and Silk Road was taken offline. In 2015, he was convicted of engaging in a continuing criminal enterprise, distributing narcotics, distributing narcotics by means of the internet, conspiracy to distribute narcotics, conspiracy to commit money laundering, conspiracy to traffic fraudulent identity documents, and conspiracy to commit computer hacking. He was sentenced to life in prison without the possibility of parole. Ulbricht's appeals to the U.S. Court of Appeals for the Second Circuit in 2017 and the U.S. Supreme Court in 2018 were unsuccessful. He is incarcerated at the United States Penitentiary in Tucson.

Early life and education
Ulbricht grew up in Austin, Texas. He was a Boy Scout, attaining the rank of Eagle Scout. He attended West Ridge Middle School and Westlake High School, both near Austin, graduating from high school in 2002.

Ulbricht attended the University of Texas at Dallas on a full academic scholarship, and graduated in 2006 with a bachelor's degree in physics. He then attended Pennsylvania State University, where he was in a master's degree program in materials science and engineering and studied crystallography. By the time Ulbricht graduated, he had become interested in libertarian economic theory; he adhered to the political philosophy of Ludwig von Mises, supported Ron Paul, promoted agorism, and participated in college debates to discuss his economic views. Ulbricht graduated from Penn State in 2009 and returned to Austin. He tried day trading and started a video game company; both ventures failed. He eventually partnered with his friend Donny Palmertree to help build an online used book seller, Good Wagon Books.

Silk Road

Creation and operation of Silk Road
Palmertree, cofounder of Good Wagon Books, eventually moved to Dallas, leaving Ulbricht to run the bookseller by himself. Around this time, Ulbricht began planning Silk Road (initially called Underground Brokers). In his personal diary, he outlined his idea for a website "where people could buy anything anonymously, with no trail whatsoever that could lead back to them." Ulbricht's ex-girlfriend said, "I remember when he had the idea ... He said something about ... the Silk Road in Asia ... and what a big network it was ... And that's what he wanted to create, so he thought it was the perfect name." Ulbricht alluded to Silk Road on his public LinkedIn page, where he discussed his wish to "use economic theory as a means to abolish the use of coercion and aggression amongst mankind" and claimed, "I am creating an economic simulation to give people a first-hand experience of what it would be like to live in a world without the systemic use of force."

Silk Road ran as an onion service on the Tor network, which implements data encryption and routes traffic through intermediary servers to anonymize the source and destination Internet Protocol addresses. By hosting his market as a Tor site, Ulbricht could conceal the server's IP address and thus its location. Bitcoin, a cryptocurrency, was used for transactions on the site. While all bitcoin transactions were recorded in a public ledger called the blockchain, users who avoided linking their legal names to their cryptocurrency wallets were able to conduct transactions with considerable anonymity. Ulbricht used the "Dread Pirate Roberts" username for Silk Road, although it is disputed whether only he used that account. He attributed his inspiration for creating the Silk Road marketplace to the novel Alongside Night and the works of Samuel Edward Konkin III.

Arrest

Law enforcement broke Silk Road's cover in a number of ways. A drug agency investigator infiltrated the site and became an admin, thereby gaining inside information about the site operations, and finding Ulbricht's chats use to be Pacific time, narrowing down his likely location. Law enforcement seized a Silk Road server in Iceland and gained a trove of chat logs, further enriching their knowledge. Ulbricht was connected to "Dread Pirate Roberts" by Gary Alford, an Internal Revenue Service investigator working with the U.S. Drug Enforcement Administration on the Silk Road case, in mid-2013. The connection was made by linking the username "altoid", used during Silk Road's early days to announce the website, and a forum post in which Ulbricht, posting under the nickname "altoid", asked for programming help and gave his email address, which contained his full name. In October 2013, the Federal Bureau of Investigation arrested Ulbricht at the Glen Park branch of the San Francisco Public Library and accused him of being the "mastermind" behind the site.

To prevent Ulbricht from encrypting or deleting files on the laptop he was using to run the site as he was arrested, two agents pretended to be quarreling lovers. When they had sufficiently distracted him, according to Joshuah Bearman of Wired, they quickly moved in to arrest him while a third agent grabbed the laptop and handed it to agent Thomas Kiernan. Kiernan then inserted a flash drive into one of the laptop's USB ports, with software that copied key files.

Ulbricht was ordered held without bail.

Trial 

On February 4, 2014, Ulbricht was charged with engaging in a continuing criminal enterprise, narcotics conspiracy, conspiracy to commit money laundering, and conspiracy to commit computer hacking.  On August 21, 2014, a superseding indictment added three additional charges. On February 4, 2015, Ulbricht was convicted on all counts after a jury trial that had taken place in January 2015. On May 29, 2015, he was sentenced to double life imprisonment plus 40 years, without the possibility of parole. Ulbricht was also ordered to pay approximately $183 million in restitution, based on the total sales of illegal drugs and counterfeit IDs through Silk Road.

Murder-for-hire allegations 
Federal prosecutors alleged that Ulbricht had paid $730,000 in murder-for-hire deals targeting at least five people, allegedly because they threatened to reveal the Silk Road enterprise. Prosecutors believe no contracted killing actually occurred. Ulbricht was not charged in his trial in New York federal court with murder for hire, but evidence was introduced at trial supporting the allegations. The district court found by a preponderance of the evidence that Ulbricht did commission the murders. The evidence that Ulbricht had commissioned murders was considered by the judge in sentencing Ulbricht to life, and was a factor in the Second Circuit's decision to affirm the sentence.

Ulbricht was separately indicted in federal court in Maryland on a single murder-for-hire charge, alleging that he contracted to kill one of his employees (a former Silk Road moderator). Prosecutors moved to drop this indictment after his New York conviction and sentence became final.

Attempts to reverse the trial outcome

Appeal 

Ulbricht appealed his conviction and sentence to the U.S. Court of Appeals for the Second Circuit in January 2016, claiming that the prosecution illegally withheld evidence of DEA agents' malfeasance in the investigation of Silk Road, of which two agents were convicted. Ulbricht also argued his sentence was too harsh. Oral arguments were heard in October 2016, and the Second Circuit issued its decision in May 2017, upholding Ulbricht's conviction and sentence in an opinion by Judge Gerard E. Lynch. In a 139-page opinion, the court affirmed the district court's denial of Ulbricht's motion to suppress certain evidence, affirmed the district court's decisions on discovery and the admission of expert testimony, and rejected Ulbricht's argument that a life sentence was procedurally or substantively unreasonable.

In December 2017, Ulbricht filed a petition for a certiorari with the United States Supreme Court, asking the Court to hear his appeal on evidentiary and sentencing issues. Ulbricht's petition asked whether the warrantless seizure of an individual's internet traffic information, without probable cause, violated the Fourth Amendment, and whether the Sixth Amendment permits judges to find facts necessary to support an otherwise unreasonable sentence. Twenty-one amici filed five amicus curiae briefs in support of Ulbricht, including the National Lawyers Guild, American Black Cross, Reason Foundation, Drug Policy Alliance, and Downsize DC Foundation. The U.S. government filed a response in opposition to Ulbricht's petition. On June 28, 2018, the Supreme Court denied the petition, declining to consider Ulbricht's appeal.

Motion to vacate or reduce the sentence 
In 2019, Ulbricht attempted to vacate his life sentence based on a claim of ineffective assistance of counsel by his defense lawyers. This attempt was initially rejected in August 2019 due to a procedural error, but the motion was refiled. The motion was denied in June 2022.

In a 2020 Vanity Fair article Nick Bilton wrote that, according to investigators and attorneys involved in the case, Ulbricht had been offered a favorable plea deal which would have likely given him a decade-long sentence, but he turned it down. Bilton wrote, "(Ulbricht) believed that he was smarter than everyone in the room, and that he could beat them all." Assistant US Attorney Timothy Howard, who was co-responsible for prosecuting the case, testified that the plea offer was made before Ulbricht's indictment and carried a mandatory minimum of 10 years to a maximum of life imprisonment, and that the United States sentencing guideline was life imprisonment.

After the conviction

Incarceration
During his trial, Ulbricht was incarcerated at the Metropolitan Correctional Center, New York. Starting in July 2017, he was held at USP Florence High. His mother, Lyn, moved to Colorado so she could visit him regularly. Ulbricht has since been transferred to USP Tucson.

Restitution paid from seized assets
In 2021, Ulbricht's prosecutors and defense agreed that Ulbricht would relinquish any ownership of a newly discovered fund of 50,676 Bitcoin (worth nearly $3.4 billion in 2021) seized from a hacker in November 2021. The Bitcoins had been stolen from Silk Road in 2013. Ulbricht had been unsuccessful in getting them back. The U.S. government traced and seized the stolen bitcoin. Ulbricht and the government agreed the fund would be used to pay off Ulbricht's $183 million debt in his criminal case, while the Department of Justice would take custody of the bitcoins.

Documentaries and films
Deep Web is a 2015 documentary film chronicling events surrounding Silk Road, bitcoin, and the politics of the dark web, including Ulbricht's trial. Silk Road—Drugs, Death and the Dark Web is a documentary covering the FBI operation to track down Ulbricht and close Silk Road. The documentary was shown on UK television in 2017 in the BBC Storyville documentary series.

The film Silk Road was released on February 19, 2021. Directed by Tiller Russell, it follows Ulbricht's creation of the website and the FBI and DEA investigations. Ulbricht is portrayed by American actor Nick Robinson.

NFT sale 
Ulbricht's family raised money for efforts to release him from jail via the decentralized autonomous organization FreeRossDAO, which accepted donations from the public. In December 2021 the family auctioned a collection of his writings and artwork as an NFT, which FreeRossDAO bought for 1,442 Ethereum, worth about $6.27 million at the time.

See also 
 Variety Jones and Smedley: pseudonyms of people reported to have been closely involved with Silk Road's founding
 USBKill: kill-switch software created in response to the circumstances of Ulbricht's arrest
 Kevin Mitnick

References

Further reading 
Greenberg, Andy. "Meet The Dread Pirate Roberts, The Man Behind Booming Black Market Drug Website Silk Road". Forbes. August 14, 2013.
Greenberg, Andy. "An Interview With A Digital Drug Lord: The Silk Road's Dread Pirate Roberts (Q&A)". Forbes. August 14, 2013.
Howell O’Neill, Patrick. "The mystery of the disappearing Silk Road murder charges". The Daily Dot. October 22, 2014.
Bertrand, Natasha. "Eerie diary entries written by the Silk Road founder who just got a life sentence". Business Insider. May 29, 2015.
Mullin, Joe. "Sunk: How Ross Ulbricht ended up in prison for life". Ars Technica. May 29, 2015.
Bearman, Joshuah. "Silk Road: The Untold Story" Wired Magazine. April/May 2015.
Bilton, Nick, American Kingpin, 2017.
 Doherty, Brian. "Ross Ulbricht's Murder-for-Hire Charges Dropped by U.S. Attorney". Reason. July 25, 2018.

1984 births
Living people
21st-century American criminals
American computer criminals
American drug traffickers
American libertarians
American money launderers
American prisoners sentenced to life imprisonment
Dark web
Penn State College of Engineering alumni
People associated with Bitcoin
People from Austin, Texas
Prisoners sentenced to life imprisonment by the United States federal government
University of Texas at Dallas alumni
Westlake High School (Texas) alumni